Acacia brachycarpa is a shrub belonging to the genus Acacia and the subgenus Phyllodineae endemic to Queensland.

The pungent, rigid, flat, linear to linear-triangular shaped phyllodes have a midrib on each face . The simple inflorescences occur singly per axil. The small spherical flower-heads contain 8 to 18 bright lemon yellow flowers.

The species was first formally described by the botanist Leslie Pedley in 1969 as part of the work Notes on Acacia, chiefly from Queensland as published in Contributions from the Queensland Herbarium. It was reclassified as Racosperma brachycarpum by Pedley in 1987 then transferred back into the genus Acacia in 2001.

The shrub has a disjunct distribution in south eastern Queensland between Stanthorpe in the south extending north as far as Blackdown Tableland National Park where it is found on rocky sandy sandstone soils as a part of open Eucalyptus woodland communities.

See also
 List of Acacia species

References

brachycarpa
Flora of Queensland
Plants described in 1969
Taxa named by Leslie Pedley